Mountainview Montessori is a public elementary school in Surrey, British Columbia part of School District 36 Surrey. It is the only publicly funded "single track" Montessori programme in Surrey. It was originally established at the historic Tynehead Elementary School  in 1990 and moved to the new site and renamed "Mountainview" in 2004.

References

Montessori schools in Canada
Elementary schools in Surrey, British Columbia